The 2017 Virginia Tech Hokies men's soccer team represents Virginia Tech during the 2017 NCAA Division I men's soccer season. It was the 46th season of the university fielding a program. The Hokies played their home fixtures at Sandra D. Thompson Field in Blacksburg, Virginia.  The Hokies were led by ninth year head coach Mike Brizendine.

Roster

Updated: August 21, 2017

Prior to the season Virginia Tech named the three captains shown above.

Coaching Staff

Source:

Schedule 

Source:

|-
!colspan=8 style=""| Exhibition

|-
!colspan=7 style=""| Regular season

|-
!colspan=7 style=""| ACC Tournament

|-
!colspan=7 style=""| NCAA Tournament

Awards and honors

Rankings

MLS Draft 
The following members of the 2017 Virginia Tech Hokies men's soccer team were selected in the 2018 MLS SuperDraft.

See also 

 Virginia Tech Hokies men's soccer
 2017 Atlantic Coast Conference men's soccer season
 2017 NCAA Division I men's soccer season
 2017 ACC Men's Soccer Tournament
 2017 NCAA Division I Men's Soccer Championship

References 

Virginia Tech Hokies
Virginia Tech Hokies men's soccer seasons
Virginia Tech Hokies, Soccer
Virginia Tech Hokies
Virginia Tech Hokies